is a Japanese anime series that was directed by Gisaburō Sugii. Made by Mushi Productions, the anime's 39 episodes were broadcast on Fuji TV between January 7, 1967, and September 30, 1967. The anime is based on the 16th-century novel Journey to the West.

Characters
 Based on Sun Wukong, the monkey king of legend, from Journey to the West. 
 
 Based on Zhu Bajie from Journey to the West. 
 Based on Sha Wujing from Journey to the West. 
 Based on Tang Sanzang, the monk from Journey to the West. 
Narrator

External links

Official Tezuka Gokū no Daibōken website 

1967 anime television series debuts
Comedy anime and manga
Fantasy anime and manga
Osamu Tezuka anime
Television shows based on Journey to the West